Medini is an abandoned village in the municipality of Bugojno, Bosnia and Herzegovina.

Demographics 
According to the 2013 census, its population was 0, down from 204 in 1991.

References

Populated places in Bugojno